Valentin Prades (born 26 September 1992) is a French modern pentathlete. He competed at the 2016 Summer Olympics in Rio de Janeiro, in the men's event.

References

External links

1992 births
Living people
French male modern pentathletes
Sportspeople from Cannes
Olympic modern pentathletes of France
Modern pentathletes at the 2016 Summer Olympics
Modern pentathletes at the 2010 Summer Youth Olympics
World Modern Pentathlon Championships medalists
Modern pentathletes at the 2020 Summer Olympics